France Théoret (born 1942) is a Canadian feminist, author, poet, and teacher.

Biography 
France Théoret was born in Montreal, Quebec on October 17, 1942. Although she grew up in a house without many books, she discovered she loved to write in school and through writing letters. She earned her baccalauréat at l'École normale Cardinal-Léger in 1965. She attended the Université de Montréal in the 1960s, earning her bachelor's degree in 1968. From 1967 to 1969 she worked on the editorial board of La Barre du jour, a student-run avant-garde literary magazine. From 1972 to 1974, she studied semiotics and psychoanalysis at the École pratique des hautes études in Paris. In 1977 she earned a Master of Letters from the Université de Montréal, and in 1982 a Ph.D. in French studies from the Université de Sherbrooke.

From 1968 to 1987, Théoret taught literature at Cégep Ahuntsic.

In 1976, she co-founded a feminist newspaper titled Les Têtes de pioche. In 1979, she co-founded Spirale, a cultural journal which she directed from 1981 to 1984.

She published her first independent piece, Bloody Mary, with Les Herbes rouges in 1977. She published three more over the next three years: Une voix pour Odile, Vertiges, and Nécessairement putain, and the four works went on to become widely studied in feminist studies. Les Herbes rouges also published her first novel, Nous parlerons comme on écrit, in 1982.

Théoret was awarded the Prix Athanase-David in 2012 for her work.

Works

Poetry 
 Bloody Mary, 1977
 Vertiges, 1979
 Nécessairement putain, 1980
 Intérieurs, 1984
 Étrangeté, l'étreinte, 1992
 La Fiction de l'ange, 1992
 Une mouche au fond de l'œil, 1998
 La Nuit de la muette, 2010
 L'Été sans erreur, 2014
 Cruauté du jeu, 2017

Fiction 
 Une voix pour Odile, 1978
 Nous parlerons comme on écrit, 1982
 L'Homme qui peignait Staline, 1989
 Trois femmes dans Nouvelles de Montréal, 1992
 Laurence, 1996
 Huis clos entre jeunes filles,2000
 Les apparatchiks vont à la mer, 2004
 Une belle éducation, 2006
 La Femme du stalinien, 2010
 Hôtel des quatre chemins, 2011
 La Zone grise, 2013
 Va et nous venge, 2015
 Les Querelleurs, 2018

Theatre 
 L'Échantillon, 1976
 Transit, 1984

Essays 
 Entre raison et déraison, 1987
 Journal pour mémoire, 1993
 La Bosnie nous regarde - essais et témoignages, 1995
 Manifeste d'écrivaines pour le 21e siècle, 1999
 Écrits au noir, 2009

Autres publications 
 Folie, Mystique et Poésie, 1988
 Enfances et Jeunesses, 1988
 Les Grands Poèmes de la poésie québécoise, 1998
 L'Écriture, c'est les cris, 2014 (with Louky Bersianik)

References 

1942 births
Living people
20th-century Canadian poets
21st-century Canadian poets
20th-century Canadian women writers
21st-century Canadian women writers
20th-century Canadian novelists
21st-century Canadian novelists
Canadian educators
Canadian women novelists
Canadian women poets
Canadian novelists in French
Canadian poets in French
Canadian women essayists
Canadian feminist writers
Prix Athanase-David winners
Université de Montréal alumni
Université de Sherbrooke alumni
Writers from Montreal
20th-century Canadian essayists
21st-century Canadian essayists
Canadian non-fiction writers in French